The Air Force Sergeants Association (AFSA) is a non-profit organization representing the professional and personal interests of nearly 111,000 active, retired and veteran total enlisted members of the United States Air Force and their families.

AFSA is the recipient of a congressional charter under Title 36 of the United States Code. It promotes enlisted concerns to enhance their quality of life, assures the preservation of entitlements earned through service and sacrifice, and maintains a vigilant presence on Capitol Hill.

Membership
Membership in the organization is open to: Air Force Active Duty (AFAD), Air National Guard (ANG), Air Force Reserve Command (AFRC) active, retired, and veteran enlisted members of all grades.  Family members (spouses, children, parents, and siblings) are also eligible for membership in AFSA. Other persons are eligible for associate memberships in AFSA.

Structure
AFSA is governed by a 12-member executive council. On the council are a president, vice president, and two trustees (representing the uniformed services, and retired & veteran personnel) who are elected by the general membership. There are seven geographical division presidents who are elected by their constituents. The former AFSA president serves as advisors to the council. A chief executive officer reports to the council and operates the international headquarters located in the Airmen Memorial Building in Suitland, Maryland.

History
AFSA was founded and incorporated on 3 May 1961, and has evolved into an organization highly respected by congressional members and Department of Defense officials. AFSA is a leading force on Capitol Hill and works closely with elected representatives and their staff members to assist in drafting proposals for legislation on issues related to military members and their families. AFSA testifies numerous times each year before House and Senate committees and sub-committees. AFSA also works closely with White House staff personnel and Pentagon officials to ensure that enlisted members' concerns are heard and acted upon.

AFSA Publications
The organization publishes AFSA Magazine, formerly Sergeants magazine. The annual Enlisted Almanac edition has been praised as the definitive reference of Air Force and DoD enlisted statistics and projections. The AFSA Newsletter, published each week, informs members of the most recent legislative action, issues, and news that affects them and provides other news of interest to the Total Air Force Enlisted Corps and their families.

Scholarship Programs
AFSA and the Airmen Memorial Foundation (AMF) conduct an annual scholarship program to financially assist the undergraduate studies of single, eligible, dependent children of AFAD, AFRC and ANG enlisted members in active duty, retired, or veteran status. The AFSA program contains membership requirement, but there is none in the AMF or CMSAF Scholarship programs. These programs combined have awarded $1,359,850 in college aid to deserving students.

Airmen Memorial Museum
The Airmen Memorial Museum (AMM) stands as a tribute to the enlisted Airmen of the United States Air Force and its predecessor services. The AMM collects and preserves artifacts, tells the enlisted story, and preserves the enlisted heritage of U.S. air and space power via public education.

http://www.hqafsa.org/

References

See also
Air Force Sergeants Association Website

Non-profit organizations based in Maryland
United States military associations
United States military support organizations
United States Air Force
American veterans' organizations
Patriotic and national organizations chartered by the United States Congress